Saint-Urbain is a parish municipality located in the Charlevoix Regional County Municipality, in Capitale-Nationale region, in Quebec, Canada.

The municipality lies along Quebec Route 381 at the intersection with Quebec Route 138.

History
Saint-Urbain was one of the localities affected by the 1925 Charlevoix–Kamouraska earthquake.

Demographics 

Population trend:
 Population in 2011: 1474 (2006 to 2011 population change: 1.8%)
 Population in 2006: 1448
 Population in 2001: 1430
 Population in 1996: 1528
 Population in 1991: 1599

Mother tongue:
 English as first language: 0%
 French as first language: 100%
 English and French as first language: 0%
 Other as first language: 0%

People born in Saint Urbain 
 Onésime Gauthier (1834-1886), a Canadian politician
 Joseph-Arsène Bonnier (1879–1962), a Canadian politician
Alice Vinette / Sister Marie-Jocelyne (1894-1989), composer

Media
Television :
 CIMT-DT
 CKRT-DT

See also 
 Rivière du Gouffre
 Rivière du Gouffre Sud-Ouest
 Le Petit Bras (Le Gros Bras)
 Rivière des Monts
 Le Gros Bras (Gouffre River tributary)
 Remy River
 List of municipalities in Quebec

References

External links

Parish municipalities in Quebec
Incorporated places in Capitale-Nationale